is a 1952 black and white Japanese film directed by Koji Shima.

The art director was Tomoo Shimogawara.

Cast 
 Hibari Misora as Marumi
 Akihiko Katayama
 Kokuten Kōdō
 Yōko Kosono as Yoko Kozono
 Koji Mitsui
 Hideaki Miura
 Bontarō Miyake as Bontaro Miake
 Zeko Nakamura as Zekō Nakamura
 Takeshi Sakamoto
 Isao Yamagata
 So Yamamura

See also
 List of films in the public domain in the United States

References 

Japanese black-and-white films
1952 films
Films directed by Koji Shima
Shochiku films
1950s Japanese films